Tesfaye Alebachew (born 27 August 1988) is an Ethiopian international footballer. He currently plays for Hadiya Hossana FC in Ethiopia, as a central midfielder. He was born in Addis Ababa.

References

External links
 Player profile on ethiofootball.com

Living people
1988 births
Sportspeople from Addis Ababa
Ethiopian footballers
Ethiopia international footballers
Association football midfielders
Ethiopian Premier League players
Hadiya Hossana F.C. players